Bass is a surname of English origin, and may refer to:

Politics, government, and military
Charles Bass (born 1952), U.S. Representative from New Hampshire
Cindy Bass, Member of the Philadelphia City Council
Fred Bass, Canadian city councillor and environmentalist
George Bass (1771–1803), British naval explorer
Hamar Bass (1842–1898), English brewer, racehorse breeder and politician, second son of Michael Thomas Bass Jr.
Harry Brinkley Bass (1916–1944), United States Navy pilot
Horace A. Bass Jr. (1915-1942), United States Navy officer and pilot
James O. Bass (1910–2019), American lawyer and politician
JoAnne S. Bass, first female senior enlisted service member of any U.S. military branch
John Meredith Bass (1804–1878), American banker, planter and Whig politician
John R. Bass, US ambassador in Georgia (country)
Karen Bass (born 1953), United States Representative from California
Kristin Bass, United States Air Force officer
Michael Thomas Bass Jr. (1799–1884), English brewer, politician and philanthropist, son of Michael Thomas Bass Sr. (see below)
Michael Arthur Bass (1837–1909), English brewer, politician and philanthropist, son of the above
Nathan Henry Bass Sr. (1808–1890), American Confederate politician
Perkins Bass (1912–2011), U.S. Representative from New Hampshire
Robert P. Bass (1873–1960), American governor of New Hampshire
Ross Bass (1918–1993), US senator from Tennessee
Sam Bass (politician) (born 1944), Australian politician
Sir William Bass, 2nd Baronet (1879–1952), British baronet and soldier

Academics, literature, and science
Bernard Bass (1925–2007), American leadership scholar
Charlotta Bass (1874–1969), American educator, newspaper publisher-editor, and civil rights activist
Eduard Bass (1888–1946), Czech novelist
Ellen Bass (born 1947), American poet and author
Frank Bass (1926–2006), American marketing research academic
George Bass (archaeologist), nautical archaeologist
Hyatt Bass, American novelist, screenwriter, film director and philanthropist
Hyman Bass (born 1932), American mathematician
Len Bass (born ca 1944), American software engineer
Leon Bass (1925–2015), US soldier and educator
Pinky Bass (born 1936), American photographer
Randall Bass, American professor of English
Rick Bass (born 1958), American writer and environmental activist
Saul Bass (1920–1996), American graphic designer
Shabbethai Bass (1641–1718), Jewish bibliographer and author
T. J. Bass, American science fiction author
Thomas Bass (born 1951), American author
Tom Bass (1916–2010), Australian sculptor
Vaughan Alden Bass, American painter
William M. Bass (born 1928), American anthropologist

Business and industry
Anne Hendricks Bass (born 1941), American investor, documentary filmmaker, philanthropist and art collector.
Ed Bass (born 1945), American businessman, financier, and philanthropist
Fred Bass (businessman) (1928–2018), American businessman, owner of the Strand Bookstore
George Henry Bass, Founder of G.H. Bass & Co. of Wilton, Maine; a leading manufacturer of shoes throughout the 20th century.
Harry W. Bass Jr. (1927–1998), American oilman, coin collector and philanthropist.
Harry W. Bass Sr. (1895–1970), American oilman and philanthropist.
Kyle Bass, Hedge fund manager
Lee Bass (born c.1957), American businessman and philanthropist
Mercedes Bass, American philanthropist
Michael Thomas Bass (1760–1827), English brewer
Nancy Lee Bass (1917–2013), American philanthropist from Fort Worth, Texas
Newton T. Bass, California oil and land developer
Perry Richardson Bass (1914–2006) was an American investor and philanthropist
Richard Bass, American oilman, mountain climber, and developer of Snowbird ski resort
Robert Bass, American businessman and philanthropist
Sid Bass (born 1942), Texas businessman
William Bass (1717–1787), English brewer, founder of Bass Brewery

Arts and entertainment
Alfie Bass (1916–1987), British actor
Ben Bass (actor) (born 1968), American-Canadian actor
Billy Bass (born 1941), American radio personality
Bobby Bass (1936–2001), American stunt performer.  Stepfather of Colin Bass and Bo Derek
Colin Bass (born 1951), British progressive rock musician
Don Bass (1946–2016), American professional wrestler
Fontella Bass (1940–2012), American soul singer
Holly Bass, American artist
Jon Bass (actor) (born 1989), American actor
Jules Bass (born 1935), American director, producer, composer, and author
Lance Bass (born 1979), American pop singer
Michelle Bass (born 1981), British glamour model and television personality
Ralph Bass (1911–1997), American record producer
Robert Bass (conductor) (1953–2008), American music director and conductor
Ronald Bass (born 1942), American screenwriter
Saul Bass (1920–1996), American graphic designer and filmmaker
Sid Bass (songwriter) (1913–1993), American songwriter and orchestra leader

Sports
Anthony Bass (born 1987), American baseball player
Ben Bass (American football) (born 1989)
Bob Bass, American basketball coach
Brandon Bass (born 1985), American basketball player
Brian Bass (born 1982), American former professional baseball player
Carleton Bass (1876–?), Irish bullfighter
Cody Bass (born 1987), Canadian hockey player
Dick Bass (1937–2006), American football running back
Glenn Bass (born 1939), American football player
John Bass (politician) (1926–2007), American boxer
John Bass (baseball) (1848–1888), baseball player
John Bass (cricketer) (1903–1992), English cricketer
Jon Bass (born 1976), English footballer
Kevin Bass (born 1959), American baseball player
Khalil Bass (born 1990), American football player
Marvin Bass (1919–2010), American college football coach
Mike Bass (born 1945), American football player
Nicole Bass (born 1964), American female bodybuilder and professional wrestler
Norm Bass (born 1939), American football player
Randy Bass (born 1954), baseball player
Richard Bass (1929–2015), American businessman and mountain climber
Sam Bass (artist) (born 1961), NASCAR artist
Tyler Bass (born 1997), American football player

Other
Edward Bass (1726–1803), American Episcopal Bishop
Elizabeth Bass (1876-1956), American physician
Sam Bass (outlaw) (1851–1878), American train robber

English-language surnames